Songs for Insects is the debut album for American progressive metal band Thought Industry. It was released in 1992 through Metal Blade Records, was produced by Dave "Rave" Ogilvie, and features as cover art "Soft Construction with Boiled Beans (Premonition of Civil War)" by Spanish surrealist Salvador Dalí.

Critical reception

In 2005, Songs for Insects was ranked number 335 in Rock Hard magazine's book The 500 Greatest Rock & Metal Albums of All Time.

Track listing
All songs written by Oberlin/Donaldson/Lee/Enzio; lyrics by Oberlin.

Personnel
Dustin Donaldson: acoustic drums, cymbals, sampled percussion, industrial devices
Christopher Lee: fretted and fretless guitars, sampling keyboard
Brent Oberlin: vocals, fretted, fretless and distorted bass, Chapman stick, piano, keyboards
Paul Enzio: 6 + 7 string guitars
Produced by Dave Ogilvie and Thought Industry

References

Thought Industry albums
1992 albums